Silat is a generic name for the martial arts of certain countries in Southeast Asia. There is untold number of Silat systems in Maritime Southeast Asia, with there being over 150 styles recognized styles of pencak silat in Indonesia, and more in aboard.

Most Silat styles can be roughly categorized into Pencak Silat (from the Indonesian Archipelago especially Java) and Silat Melayu (from Malay Peninsula and Sumatra).

Pencak Silat

Minangkabau
 Silat Harimau

Java
Tapak Suci
Inti Ombak
Perisai Diri

Betawi
Cingkrik
Beksi
Kwitang
Sabeni

Bali
Bakti Negara

Other
Tunggal Hati Seminari

Silat Melayu

Malaysia

Seni Gayong
Seni Gayung Fatani
Lian Padukan

Thailand
 Silat Pattani

Other

Europe 
 Perisai Diri

References

Silat